Commnet Wireless is an American telecommunications company which offers wholesale roaming, enterprise, and retail solutions to other mobile network operators. It is a subsidiary of ATN International. Commnet serves the U.S. states of Arizona, California, Colorado, Montana, Nebraska, New Mexico, Nevada, North Dakota, Oregon, Texas, Utah, and Wyoming.

Commnet Wireless also operates the Choice Wireless and Choice Broadband brands, which provide wireless and wireline service to customers in the western United States.

Wireless networks

Radio frequency spectrum chart 
The following chart lists the known frequency owned and/or deployed by Commnet Wireless.

References 

Mobile phone companies of the United States
Castle Rock, Colorado
Companies based in Colorado